Dan Grayson (1967-Aug. 1, 2021) was a former American football linebacker who played one season with the Saskatchewan Roughriders of the Canadian Football League. He was drafted by the Pittsburgh Steelers in the seventh round of the 1990 NFL Draft. He played college football at Washington State University, where he was a 1st Team All-Pac-10 selection at linebacker in 1989.
Due to his behavioral difficulties and change in personality, Grayson believed he had chronic traumatic encephalopathy from his football career and donated his brain to science.

References

External links
Just Sports Stats
Fanbase profile

Living people
Year of birth missing (living people)
Players of American football from Washington (state)
American football linebackers
Canadian football linebackers
American players of Canadian football
Washington State Cougars football players
Saskatchewan Roughriders players